is a passenger railway station in located in the town of  Komono,  Mie Prefecture, Japan, operated by the private railway operator Kintetsu Railway.

Lines
Yunoyama-Onsen Station is a terminal station of the Yunoyama Line, and is located 15.4 rail kilometers from the opposing terminus of the line at Kintetsu-Yokkaichi Station.

Station layout
The station consists of two bay platforms, one of which is only used early in the mornings.  There is a Sanco bus station immediately outside the station entrance.  This station has a window for buying limited express tickets.

Platforms

Adjacent stations

History
March 1, 1931 - Due to mergers, station falls under the ownership of Mie Railway.
February 11, 1944 - Due to mergers, station falls under the ownership of Sanco.
February 1, 1964 - Railway division of Sanco splits off and forms separate company, station falls under the ownership of Mie Electric Railway.
April 1, 1965 - Due to mergers, stations fall under the ownership of Kintetsu.
July 15, 1965 - Direct Kintetsu limited express service between both Osaka and Nagoya begins.
March 1, 1970 - Officially renamed Yunoyama-Onsen Station.
1979 - Platforms extended to support 4-car trains.
March 17, 1998 - Direct service to both Osaka and Nagoya ends.
March 18, 2004 - Limited express service ends.
April 1, 2007 - Support for PiTaPa and ICOCA begins.

Passenger statistics
In fiscal 2019, the station was used by an average of 258 passengers daily (boarding passengers only).

Surrounding area
Yunoyama Onsen
Mount Gozaisho
Gozaisho Ropeway

See also
List of railway stations in Japan

References

External links

Kintetsu: Yunoyama-Onsen Station 

Railway stations in Japan opened in 1963
Railway stations in Mie Prefecture
Komono